The World Journal of Urology is a peer-reviewed scientific journal of urology published by Springer in collaboration with the Société Internationale d'Urologie (SIU). It is the official journal of both the Société Internationale d'Urologie and of the Urological Research Society.

The journal was established in April 1983 and is published on an monthly basis. 

Martin Burchardt is the editor-in-chief since January 2008. The second editor-in-chief is Alexandre de la Taille.

Abstracing and indexing
The journal is abstracted and indexed in the following bibliographic databases:

According to the Journal Citation Reports, the journal has a 2017 impact factor of 2.981.

References

External links

Springer Science+Business Media academic journals
Urology journals
English-language journals
Publications established in 1983
Monthly journals